The 1996 All-Ireland Senior Hurling Championship Final was the 109th All-Ireland Final and the culmination of the 1996 All-Ireland Senior Hurling Championship, an inter-county hurling tournament for the top teams in Ireland. The match was held at Croke Park, Dublin, on 1 September 1996, between Wexford and Limerick. The Munster champions lost to their Leinster opponents on a score line of 1-13 to 0-14.

References

External links
Article on the final

All-Ireland Senior Hurling Championship Final
All-Ireland Senior Hurling Championship Final, 1996
All-Ireland Senior Hurling Championship Final
All-Ireland Senior Hurling Championship Finals
Limerick GAA matches
Wexford GAA matches